A molecule editor is a computer program for creating and modifying representations of chemical structures.

Molecule editors can manipulate chemical structure representations in either a simulated two-dimensional space or three-dimensional space, via 2D computer graphics or 3D computer graphics, respectively. Two-dimensional output is used as illustrations or to query chemical databases. Three-dimensional output is used to build molecular models, usually as part of molecular modelling software packages.

Database molecular editors such as Leatherface, RECAP, and Molecule Slicer allow large numbers of molecules to be modified automatically according to rules such as 'deprotonate carboxylic acids' or 'break exocyclic bonds' that can be specified by a user.

Molecule editors typically support reading and writing at least one file format or line notation. Examples of each include Molfile and simplified molecular input line entry specification (SMILES), respectively.

Files generated by molecule editors can be displayed by molecular graphics tools.

Standalone programs

Java Applets

JavaScript embeddable editors

See also 
 ChemSpider
 Comparison of software for molecular mechanics modeling
 Molecular design software

Notes and references

External links
 Molecular structure input on the web
 The Chemical Structure Editor: Bridging Chemistry and Cheminformatics

Chemistry software
Computational chemistry